Beyond Acoustic is an album by Philippine acoustic band MYMP (Make Your Momma Proud), released under Ivory Music in 2005. Beyond Acoustic was the biggest selling album ever produced by an acoustic band. The album debuted at number six on the Philippine Top Albums chart, It had been certified Gold Record after less than a month having sold 15,000 copies, To date the album had sold 210,700 copies in the Philippines.

Commercial performance
In the Philippines, Beyond Acoustic debuted on the chart after two weeks, debuting at number six on the Philippine Top Albums chart on (July 15, 2005). Then on its second week on the chart it stayed on number six position. On its third week the album had left the chart, it spent only two weeks on the chart. The album had sold 15,000 copies in the Philippines, after a month of its release being certified PARI Gold. To date, Beyond Acoustic had sold 210,700 copies in the Philippines.

Track listing

Personnel
 Antonio M. Ocampo - Executive producer
 Papa Zu - Album producer
 Grace de Leon - A&R direction
 Jon Daza - A&R coordination
 Bernardo Placido, Jr. - Album package design & digital imaging
 Chin Alcantara - Arranger (all songs)
 Annie Quintos - Vocal supervision
 Ponz Martinez - Song recording & mastering
 Joel mendoza - Song mixing
 Snaffu Rigor - Additional musician (percussion)
 Rico Sobrevinas - Additional musician (flute)
 Pierre Cruz - Photography
 Effie Go of Visage Salon - Hair & make-up
 Carla Lozada - MYMP management

References

2005 albums
MYMP albums